Ernest Bloch (July 24, 1880 – July 15, 1959) was a Swiss-born American composer. Bloch was a preeminent artist in his day, and left a lasting legacy. He is recognized as one of the greatest Swiss composers in history. As well as producing musical scores, Bloch had an academic career that culminated in his recognition as Professor Emeritus at the University of California, Berkeley in 1952.

Biography
Bloch was born in Geneva on July 24, 1880, to Jewish parents. He began playing the violin at age 9, and began composing soon after. He studied music at the conservatory in Brussels, where his teachers included the celebrated Belgian violinist Eugène Ysaÿe. He then traveled around Europe, moving to Germany (where he studied composition from 1900 to 1901 with Iwan Knorr at the Hoch Conservatory in Frankfurt), on to Paris in 1903 and back to Geneva before settling in the United States in 1916, taking US citizenship in 1924. He held several teaching appointments in the US, where his pupils included George Antheil, Frederick Jacobi, Quincy Porter, Bernard Rogers, and Roger Sessions. 

In 1917, Bloch became the first teacher of composition at Mannes School of Music, a post he held for three years. In December 1920 he was appointed the first Musical Director of the newly formed Cleveland Institute of Music, a post he held until 1925. In 1919 the San Francisco Symphony gave two of the earliest performances of his Schelomo, receiving high praise from multiple critics. Ada Clement and Lillian Hodghead of the newly named San Francisco Conservatory of Music visited Bloch in Cleveland in 1923 and invited him to teach at the Conservatory the following summer. He had previously been encouraged to come to San Francisco by Alfred Hertz and Temple Emanu El cantor Reuben Rinder. In 1925 Bloch resigned from the Cleveland Institute, where he had not been happy, and relocated to San Francisco. He was named the director of the Conservatory and remained in that position until 1930, when the school was running low on funds. He returned to Switzerland, where he composed his "Avodath Hakodesh" ("Sacred Service") before returning to the US in 1939.
 
Bloch joined the music faculty at Berkeley in 1941 and taught there one semester each year until his retirement in 1952. He and his wife lived primarily in the small coastal community of Agate Beach, Oregon (now Newport). In 1947 he was among the founders of the Music Academy of the West summer conservatory.

In 1952 he was named a Professor Emeritus at the University of California, even though he had not been a full-time faculty member. He composed "In Memoriam" that year after the death of Ada Clement.

He died on July 15, 1959, in Portland, Oregon, of cancer at the age of 78. In keeping with a special tradition, his daughter, Lucienne Bloch, and her husband, Steve Dimitroff, prepared several death masks of Ernest Bloch. This once-common practice was usually undertaken to create a memento or portrait of the deceased, but it is unusual for an immediate family member to make the death mask. The Center for Creative Photography and the San Francisco Conservatory of Music each have a copy of Bloch's death mask. His body was cremated and his ashes were scattered in the Pacific ocean near his home in Agate Beach.

Music

Bloch's compositions are often described as reflecting his Jewish heritage, yet had many other sources. "Perhaps what is at the heart of the question is his genius for evocative color in music. If some of his works evoke the atmosphere of the Old Testament, they operate elsewhere with equally telling and totally different effect: the Gauguinesque South Seas in the slow movement of the first Quintet, and the Chinese of the Episodes are examples. Beside Israel stand Helvetia and America; beside Scenes from Jewish Life stands Nirvana."

Bloch's musical style does not fit easily into any of the usual categories. He studied variously with Émile Jaques-Dalcroze, Iwan Knorr and Ludwig Thuille, as well as corresponding with Gustav Mahler and meeting Claude Debussy. Many of his works - as can be seen from their Hebrew-inspired titles - also draw heavily on his Jewish heritage. Bloch's father had at one stage intended to become a rabbi, and the young Ernest had a strong religious upbringing; as an adult he felt that to write music that expressed his Jewish identity was "the only way in which I can produce music of vitality and significance".

The music of Bloch uses a variety of contemporary harmonic devices. These are enumerated in Vincent Persichetti's book Twentieth Century Harmony. According to Persichetti, these include the use of the Dorian mode and of harmony with extensive alterations in his Concerto Grosso No. 1, tone clusters in his Piano Sonata, the percussive use of harmony, as well as serial harmony, in his Piano Quintet No. 1.

Family

Ernest Bloch and his wife Marguerite Schneider (1881–1963) had three children: Ivan, Suzanne and Lucienne.

Ivan, born in 1905, became an engineer with the Bonneville Power Administration in Portland, Oregon.

Suzanne Bloch, born in 1907, was a musician particularly interested in Renaissance music who taught harpsichord, lute and composition at the Juilliard School in New York.

Lucienne Bloch, born in 1909, worked as Diego Rivera's chief photographer on the Rockefeller Center mural project, became friends with Rivera's wife, the artist Frida Kahlo, and took some key photos of Kahlo and the only photographs of Rivera's mural (which was destroyed because Lenin was depicted in it).

Photography
The Western Jewish History Center, of the Judah L. Magnes Museum, in Berkeley, California, has a small collection of photographs taken by Ernest Bloch which document his interest in photography.

Bloch's photography was discovered by Eric B. Johnson in 1970. With the encouragement of Bloch's children, Johnson edited and printed hundreds of his photographs.

Many of the photographs Bloch took—over 6,000 negatives and 2,000 prints many printed by Eric Johnson from the original negatives—are in the Ernest Bloch Archive at the Center for Creative Photography at the University of Arizona in Tucson along with photographs by the likes of Ansel Adams, Edward Weston and Richard Avedon.

Some of the pictures that Bloch took in his Swiss residence are visible online. The snapshots have been donated to the Archivio audiovisivo di Capriasca e Val Colla by the Associazione ricerche musicali nella Svizzera italiana.

Legacy

Ernest Bloch's home in Agate Beach was listed on the National Register of Historic Places on February 9, 2009. The Bloch Memorial, which was dedicated by Oregon Governor Bob Straub with Ernest Bloch's three children at his side on April 10, 1976, was moved from near his house in Agate Beach to a more prominent location in front of the Newport Performing Arts Center in nearby Newport, Oregon. In 2009, the City of Newport City Council designated the intersection of NW 49th Street, Woody Way and Gilbert Way as Ernest Bloch Place. In 2016, the Oregon Department of Transportation Board of Commissioners officially designated the Ernest Bloch Memorial Wayside in the area of Agate Beach where the original Ernest Bloch Memorial was dedicated in 1976. The Ernest Bloch Memorial Wayside, the 1976 monument and a new Monument were formally dedicated in 2018,. The informal Ernest Bloch Legacy Project was created by Dr. Frank Jo Maitland Geltner in 2003. The Ernest Bloch Legacy Project affiliated with the Lincoln County Historical Society in 2021.

References

Further reading
Ernest Bloch: Composer in Nature's University by Nancy Steinberg. Oregon Coastal Council for the Arts. July, 2006; Edited by Frank Geltner and members of Bloch family, 2007, 2008; Edited by Frank Geltner, Alexander Knapp, and members of the Bloch family, 2013.
 Strassburg, Robert. Ernest Bloch: Voice In the Wilderness, California State University & Trident Shop, Los Angeles, 1977 ASIN #B001LO4X86
 Grove, Gregory Alan. The Life and Music of Ernest Bloch. Thesis (M.A.), San José State University, 1976). San Jose, Calif. San Jose State University, Department of Music 1976. 
 Eric B. Johnson prepared Ernest Bloch: A Composer's Vision for an independent study thesis at the University of Oregon in 1971. Johnson researched, edited and printed many of Bloch's photographs. 40 of these prints from Bloch's negatives are now in the Center for Creative Photography in Tucson AZ along with the entire collection of his negatives and prints. Johnson is currently Professor of Art and Design at Cal Poly State University, San Luis Obispo Ca. An account of his discovery and many of Bloch's images can be found on his website. [ericjohnsonphoto.com]
 Simmons, Walter. Voices in the Wilderness: Six American Neo-Romantic Composers, (Lanham, MD: Scarecrow Press, 2004) 
 Kushner, David Z. The Ernest Bloch Companion, (Greenwood Press, Westport, Connecticut, 2002) 
 Kintner, Helen Johnston. The Ernest Bloch I Knew (Published by Helen Johnston Kinter, June 2009) 
 Werlin, Joella. Suzanne Bloch: Recollections (Familore, Portland, Oregon, 2007) 
 Bloch, Suzanne. Ernest Bloch: Creative Spirit: A Program Source Book (Jewish Music Council of the National Jewish Welfare Board, 1976).
 Johnson, Eric B. A Composer's Vision (Aperture 16:3, Millerton, New York, 1972)

External links
 
 
Art of the States: Ernest Bloch String Quartet No. 2 (1945)
Extensive discography (and work list), by Claude Torres
Ernest Bloch's maximum card from Israel
The Robert Straussburg Collection of Ernest Bloch at the Belknap Collection of Performing Arts, University of Florida.
Images of the Ernest Bloch House from the University of Oregon digital archives
 
Ernest Bloch Collection, Ernest Bloch Online Collection, and Eric Johnson Collection of Ernest Bloch Photographs at the Library of Congress
 Ernest Bloch Collection and Bloch Festschrift Collection at Sibley Music Library, Eastman School of Music

1880 births
1959 deaths
19th-century American composers
19th-century American male musicians
19th-century classical composers
20th-century classical composers
American male classical composers
American classical composers
Cleveland Institute of Music faculty
Deaths from cancer in Oregon
Hoch Conservatory alumni
Jewish classical composers
Jewish American classical composers
Jews and Judaism in Oregon
Musicians from Geneva
People from Lincoln County, Oregon
Pupils of Iwan Knorr
Pupils of Ludwig Thuille
San Francisco Conservatory of Music faculty
Swiss classical composers
Swiss emigrants to the United States
Swiss-German people
Swiss Jews
Mannes College The New School for Music faculty
20th-century American composers
Classical musicians from California
20th-century American male musicians
Music Academy of the West founders
20th-century Swiss composers